Thiago Luna Brizuela (born 9 February 1998) is an Argentine professional footballer who plays as a midfielder for Colegiales.

Career
Luna's career started with Colegiales. He made his professional bow under manager Juan Carlos Kopriva in Primera B Metropolitana in April 2019, featuring for eleven minutes of a 0–1 win away to Justo José de Urquiza; another appearance arrived a month later against Atlanta, when he replaced Diego Chávez off the bench.

Career statistics
.

References

External links

1998 births
Living people
People from Malvinas Argentinas Partido
Argentine footballers
Association football midfielders
Primera B Metropolitana players
Club Atlético Colegiales (Argentina) players
Sportspeople from Buenos Aires Province